The 2022 Thailand Champions Cup was the 6th Thailand Champions Cup, an annual football match played between the winners of the previous season's Thai League 1 and Thai FA Cup. As Buriram United won both competitions in 2021–22, their opponents were the 2021–22 Thai League 1 runners-up, BG Pathum United. It was sponsored by Daikin, and known as the Daikin Thailand Champions Cup for sponsorship purposes. The match was played on 6 August 2022 at the His Majesty the King's 80th Birthday Anniversary Stadium in Mueang, Nakhon Ratchasima. It has live broadcast on PPTV HD and AIS Play.

Qualified teams

Match

Details

Assistant referees:
 Apichit Nophuan
 Rachain Srichai
Fourth official:
 Niwat Insa-ard
Assistant VAR:
 Sivakorn Pu-udom
 Tanin Reunjit

Winner

See also
 2022–23 Thai League 1
 2022–23 Thai League 2
 2022–23 Thai League 3
 2022–23 Thai League 3 Northern Region
 2022–23 Thai League 3 Northeastern Region
 2022–23 Thai League 3 Eastern Region
 2022–23 Thai League 3 Western Region
 2022–23 Thai League 3 Southern Region
 2022–23 Thai League 3 Bangkok Metropolitan Region
 2022–23 Thai League 3 National Championship
 2022–23 Thai FA Cup
 2022–23 Thai League Cup

References

2022 in Thai football cups
Thailand Champions Cup
2022